NGC 4503 is a barred lenticular galaxy located around 41 to 74 million light-years away in the constellation Virgo. NGC 4503 was discovered by astronomer William Herschel on March 15, 1784. NGC 4503 is a member of the Virgo Cluster.

See also
 List of NGC objects (4001–5000)
 NGC 4754

References

External links

Virgo (constellation)
Barred lenticular galaxies
4503
41538
7680
Astronomical objects discovered in 1784
Virgo Cluster
Discoveries by William Herschel